Cullenhugh is a townland in County Westmeath, Ireland. The River Inny forms its northwestern boundary.

Cullenhugh is one of 15 townlands of the civil parish of Leny in the barony of Corkaree in the Province of Leinster. The neighbouring townlands are: Ballinalack, Carrick and Glebe to the north, Ballyvade and Leny to the east, Farrow to the south and Joanstown to the west.

In the 1911 census of Ireland there were 5 houses and 25 inhabitants in the townland.

References

External links
Cullenhugh at the IreAtlas Townland Data Base
Cullenhugh at Townlands.ie
 Cullenhugh at Logainm.ie

Townlands of County Westmeath